Kanjvaran-e Vosta (also Romanized as Kanjvarān-e Vosţá; also known as Ganjvarān-e Vosţá, Gheyb Qolī, Gheyb Qolī Pā’īn, and Gheyb Qolī-ye Pā’īn) is a village in Miyan Rud Rural District, Qolqol Rud District, Tuyserkan County, Hamadan Province, Iran. At the 2006 census, its population was 71, in 15 families.

References 

Populated places in Tuyserkan County